The 2015 Travelers Curling Club Championship was held from November 23 to 28 at the Ottawa Hunt and Golf Club in Ottawa, Ontario.

Men

Teams

Round-robin standings

Pool A

Pool B

Tie-Breaker
Friday, November 27, 9:30

Playoffs

Quarterfinals
Friday, November 27, 14:30

Semifinals
Friday, November 27, 19:30

Bronze-medal game
Saturday, November 28, 11:00

Final
Saturday, November 28, 11:00

Women

Teams

Round-robin standings

Pool A

Pool B

Playoffs

Quarterfinals
Friday, November 27, 14:30

Semifinals
Friday, November 23, 19:30

Bronze-medal game
Saturday, November 28, 11:00

Final
Saturday, November 28, 11:00

External links

2015 in Canadian curling
Curling in Ottawa
Travelers Curling Club Championship
Canadian Curling Club Championships
2010s in Ottawa
November 2015 sports events in Canada